The Russian submarine AG-11 was an AG-class  submarine, designed by the American Holland Torpedo Boat Company/Electric Boat Company, built for the Imperial Russian Navy during World War I. The submarine was fabricated in Canada, shipped to Russia and reassembled for service with the Baltic Fleet.

Description
AG-11 was a single-hulled submarine, with a pressure hull divided into five watertight compartments. She displaced  on the surface and  submerged.

The submarine had two 3-bladed propellers, each of which was driven by a  diesel engine as well as a  electric motors. This arrangement gave AG-22 a maximum speed of  while surfaced and  submerged.

The AG-class submarines were equipped with four  torpedo tubes in the bow and carried eight torpedoes. For surface combat they had one  deck gun.

Construction and service
The Holland 602 design was widely exported during World War I and the Imperial Russian Navy ordered a total of 17, in three batches, of a version known as the American Holland-class (AG in Russian for Amerikansky Golland (American Holland)). The submarines were to be built in Canada as knock-down kits for assembly in Russia.

Components for the first batch of five submarines were assembled in Barnet, near Vancouver, Canada, and shipped to Vladivostok. There they were loaded onto the Trans-Siberian Railroad and transported to Saint Petersburg where they were assembled by the Baltic Works by June 1916. During World War I Russian and British submarines operated from bases in Finland. The Russian submarines of Holland type (AG-11, AG-12, AG-15 and AG-16) were scuttled in the harbor of Hanko on 3 April 1918 just prior to the German landing there.

Notes

Bibliography 
 Building Submarines for Russia in Burrard Inlet by W.Kaye Lamb published in BC Studies No.71 Autumn, 1986

 

American Holland-class submarines
Ships built in Groton, Connecticut
Ships built in Russia
1916 ships
World War I submarines of Russia
Maritime incidents in 1918
Scuttled vessels
Shipwrecks of Finland
Shipwrecks in the Gulf of Finland
World War I shipwrecks in the Baltic Sea